"Sunce se djevojkom ženi" or "Sun marrying the girl" is a Mythological lyric of Serbian folk literature. It dates from the Middle-ages. This lyric was recorded by Vuk Stefanović Karadžić in the 19th century in the ijekavian accent of Stokavian dialect. "Sunce se djevojkom ženi" is in the curriculum for High schools in Serbia (in readers).

Content
The song is about the sublime beauty of a girl, who is quite conceited about it – she provokes the sun in the following verse: "Bright sun, I am more beautiful than you". (Sun symbolizes the source of life on earth, heat, light...). Then, there is the motive of passion for the beauty of the Maiden of sun when it has seen the beautiful Maiden (girl). After, the sun has taken away the girl to take her as its lover; from the girl, then, became the  morning star.

Literature   
Reader for 1st class of High schools; authors: Mr Ljiljana Nikolić, Bosiljka Milić, Institute for Textbooks and Teaching Aids, Belgrade (Original Title: ЧИТАНКА са књижевнотеоријским појмовима за 1. разред средње школе; аутори: мр Љиљана Николић и Босиљка Милић. Завод за уџбенике Београд.)

References 

Poetry anthologies